Texas Open may refer to:
Valero Texas Open, a men's golf tournament on the PGA Tour
Texas State Open, a men's golf tournament
Texas Women's Open, a women's golf tournament
Texas Tennis Open, a tennis tournament on the WTA tour, which started in 2011
Texas Open Finswimming Invitational, a finswimming competition
Texas Open (squash), an annual women's pro squash tournament